is a Japanese composer and arranger. He is best known for composing the scores for anime series, such as Death Note, Hunter × Hunter (2011), and Edens Zero. He has also made the orchestration for video games, mostly in the Final Fantasy franchise.

Biography 
Yoshihisa Hirano was born in Wakayama, Japan, in 1971. He studied composition at Juilliard School, in 1992, with Stanley Wolfe. He later entered Eastman School of Music, where he studied with Christopher Rouse and Joseph Schwantner. Some of the awards he has received include first prize in the Axia Tape Competition, in Japan, during his high school years, and New York's New Music for Young Ensembles.

Hirano made his debut as a composer in 2001, in the anime series Beyblade. After that, he made the music for Tokyo DisneySea's 2002 and 2004 countdown celebrations. In 2002, Hirano paired with pianist Masako Hosoda to form the unit Bleu, releasing 3 albums since then. Hirano was also responsible for some of the orchestration and arrangement for a number of Ali Project's albums.

Since then, Hirano has composed for many anime series, as well as music for concert, dance, film and radio, with compositions ranging from classical to pop and contemporary music.

Works

Anime 
Yoshihisa Hirano has participated in the making of the soundtracks from the following anime works:

Video games

References

External links 
 
 Yoshihisa Hirano discography at VGMdb
 Yoshihisa Hirano at Oricon 
 Yoshihisa Hirano anime at Media Arts Database 
 
 

1971 births
Anime composers
Japanese composers
Japanese film score composers
Japanese male composers
Japanese male film score composers
Living people
Musicians from Wakayama Prefecture
Pupils of Joseph Schwantner